Kilikiti, also known as Samoan cricket or kirikiti, is one of several forms of the game of cricket. Originating in Samoa (English missionaries introduced their game of cricket in the early 19th century), it spread throughout Polynesia and can now be found around the world in areas with strong Polynesian populations. The game is the national sport of Samoa, and is played in many other Pacific countries, including amongst the Pacific Islander diaspora in Australia and New Zealand.

Etymology
The term kilikiti is borrowed from Samoan, Tongan and Tuvaluan. Kilikiti is the Samoan and Tongan term for the sport of cricket and derived from English. The term in Samoan is sometimes spelt kirikiti, which is also the Māori name for the sport.

Form of the game

Equipment
The ball is made of a very hard rubber wrapped in pandanus. Players are not protected by any padding or masks, and will often wear only a lava-lava. The sennit-wrapped wooden bat is modeled on the three-sided Samoan war club called the "lapalapa," which are based on the stalk of coconut fronds. Bats are shaped to individual players' likings and can be over a meter long; because the striking surface of the bat is angled (just as the "lapalapa" club and the coconut frond stalk), the path of a hit ball is extremely hard to predict.

Rules
The rules of kilikiti are flexible. Indeed, the majority of reports written on the game simply say that the rules can only be known by those playing.

Similarities to cricket

There is a batting team, a fielding team, and a pitch (sometimes of concrete). The bowl alternates between two bowlers, one at each end of the pitch; accordingly, there are two wicket keepers (this as opposed to the single wicket keeper in cricket).

Major points on which kilikiti differs from cricket
There is no limit to team size, and teams are made up of whoever turns up regardless of gender or age. Tourist accounts mention that strangers are often welcomed.  Players are typically all-rounders.

A kilikiti game is a multi-day community event full of singing, dancing, and feasting. Entire villages will compete and everyone will be involved, whether as player, cook, or spectator. According to one source, the only universal rule is that the host team forfeits if it cannot provide enough food.

Standardization
The New Zealand Kilikiti Association (NZKA) is working to standardize the rules of kilikiti. In 1999 the NZKA started a national tournament, called the Supercific Kilikiti Tournament, and in 2001 it introduced the international World Cup Kilikiti Tournament. Games have been cut to a television-friendly 70 minutes (2 innings, the first being 30 minutes long and the second bowling the same number of balls as the first). The NZKA has also added the scoring of 4s and 6s.

Kilikiti World Cup

By country

Australia
Kilikiti is a growing sport in Australia, particularly among Samoan Australians.

The Fetuilelagi Kilikiti Tournament is held annually in Brisbane. In 2022, 15 teams competed.

Tournaments have also been held in other cities, such as Melbourne and Sydney.

New Zealand
Kilikiti has become a popular sport across New Zealand. It is especially popular among Samoan New Zealanders.

Tournaments have been held across the country, mostly in Auckland.

The Counties Manakau Kilikiti Association is the main league for the sport in New Zealand.

Samoa
Kilikiti originated in Samoa and is popular nationwide.

Other Pacific Islands
Like in Samoa, the sport is also widespread in American Samoa.

The sport has also been played in Fiji, Niue, Tokelau, Tonga and Tuvalu.

Elsewhere
The sport has also been played in countries such as the United States.

See also

Cricket in Oceania
Trobriand cricket

References

External links
New Zealand Kilikiti Association

2001 Kilikiti World Cup highlights on YouTube

 
Short form cricket
Cricket in Samoa
Sports originating in Samoa
Sport in Tuvalu